Tung Shan, Tung-shan, Tungshan, or variant, can refer to:

People
Tung-shan Liang-chieh  (807–869), Medieval Chinese Zen teacher; writer of The Record of Tung Shan
Tung-shan Shou-ch'u (died 900), Medieval Chinese Zen teacher

Places
Tung Shan (mountain), a hill in Hong Kong.
Tung-shan, Chiayi, Taiwan; a former district (Taiwan)

Facilities and structures
Tung Shan Temple, Wing Ping Tsuen, Hong Kong; one of the Tin Hau temples in Hong Kong
Tung Shan Mansion, Taikoo Shing, Hong Kong
Tung-Shan, Kampung Manggis, Pappar, Sahab, Malaysia; a Chinese primary school, see List of Chinese national-type primary schools in Sabah

Other uses
 SS Tung Shan, a British cargo ship; see List of shipwrecks in May 1917

See also

Dongshan (disambiguation), which may also be spelled Tung-shan
Shan (disambiguation)
Tung (disambiguation)
Shan Tung (disambiguation)